The canton of Saint-Malo-Sud is a former canton of France, located in the arrondissement of Saint-Malo, in the Ille-et-Vilaine département, Brittany région. It had 23,198 inhabitants (2012). It was disbanded following the French canton reorganisation which came into effect in March 2015.

Composition
The canton comprised the following communes:
 La Gouesnière ;
 Saint-Jouan-des-Guérets ;
 Saint-Malo (fraction).

Election results

At the 2011 cantonal elections, UMP councillor Gilles Lurton was elected to represent the canton of Saint-Malo-Sud in the general council of Ille-et-Vilaine department.

2004

1998

References

Saint-Malo-Sud
2015 disestablishments in France
States and territories disestablished in 2015